"So Wonderful" is a song recorded by the South Korean girl group Ladies' Code. It was released as a digital single on February 13, 2014, by  Polaris Entertainment. It is one of the best charting songs the group has released, with a peak positionof 18 on the Billboard Hot 100 K-pop songs.

Track listing 
 All the songs in this album are written, composed and arranged by Super Changddai.

Charts and sales

Sales

Release history

References

External links
 

Korean-language songs
2014 singles
Ladies' Code songs
2014 songs